Mom Chim Huy (born 18 April 1939) is a Cambodian politician. He belongs to the Cambodian People's Party and was elected to represent Kandal Province in the National Assembly of Cambodia in 2003.

See also
Politics of Cambodia

References

1939 births 
Members of the National Assembly (Cambodia)
Members of the Senate (Cambodia) 
Cambodian People's Party politicians
Living people